Iris Green Falcam (August 25, 1938 – February 19, 2010) was an American-born Micronesian librarian, researcher and public servant. Falcam served as the First Lady of the Federated States of Micronesia from 1999 to 2003 during the tenure of her husband, former President Leo Falcam.

Iris Falcam was a native of Hawaii, but resided in what is now the Federated States of Micronesia for more than forty years. She attended both the University of Hawaiʻi at Mānoa and Kapiolani Technical School, which is now called Kapiolani Community College.

Falcam worked as the librarian and researcher for the College of Micronesia-FSM Pacific Islands collection from 1979 until her death in 2010. She also worked as the librarian for the Congress of the Federated States of Micronesia, as well as for the public information office at the Trust Territory of the Pacific Islands headquarters on Saipan earlier in her career. Falcam's numerous civic involvements in the FSM included a seat on the board of Pohnpei Catholic School, treasurer of the Pohnpei Lions Club and membership in a Catholic women’s organization called Lih en Mercedes.

Iris Green Falcam died on Friday, February 19, 2010 in Pohnpei. She was survived by her husband, former President Leo Falcam. President Manny Mori called Falcam, "gracious and caring mother of our nation."

References

1938 births
2010 deaths
First ladies of the Federated States of Micronesia
People from Honolulu
American librarians
American women librarians
Federated States of Micronesia librarians
University of Hawaiʻi at Mānoa alumni
People from Pohnpei State
American emigrants to the Federated States of Micronesia
Federated States of Micronesia women
American librarians of Asian descent
21st-century American women